Big Bill Creek is a stream in the U.S. state of Montana. It is a tributary to the Spotted Bear River.

Big Bill Creek was named in 1914 after a trail supervisor.

References

Rivers of Montana
Rivers of Flathead County, Montana